Eviella hynesae is a species of dugesiid triclad, and is the only species in the monotypic genus Eviella.

References

Dugesiidae
Rhabditophora genera
Monotypic protostome genera